Lezignan 9s is a rugby league nines tournament held in Lézignan-Corbières, France. It was last held on the 15 and 16 September 2007.

The organisation committee is considering moving the date of the event to late October, when British National League clubs would be available to participate. The date would also coincide with the release of the 'Vin Nouveau', which is a major event in this wine-producing area of southern France.

International Lezignan 9s 2007 Results
Trophée des Vendanges : Moroccan Lions 16 - Montpellier 12
Trophee des Vendanges (Women): Toulouse Ovalie
Coupe de la Ville : Carpentras 12- Cambridge University 10
Coupe de la fédération : Serbia 24 - XIII Catalan 12
Coupe du Vin, Juniors : Pole Espoirs Carcassonne 18 - 14 Lezignan Academy
Trophée Fair Play : XIII Catalan
Yacine Khattabi memorial, player of the tournament: Irakli Modebadze (Géorgie, Montpellier)
Département de l'Aude trophy. Player of the tournament (women): Anne Sophie Carnus

See also

Rugby league in France

References

External links

Recurring sporting events established in 2007
Rugby league in France
Rugby league nines
European rugby league competitions